The UNESCO (United Nations Educational, Scientific and Cultural Organization) has designated 37 World Heritage Sites in eight countries (also called "state parties") commonly referred to as Northern Europe: Iceland, Norway, Sweden, Finland, Denmark, Estonia, Latvia and Lithuania, i.e. a combination of Nordic and Baltic countries. The Danish territory of the Faroe Islands doesn't have any sites. Greenland, lying on the North American continent, is not included in this list despite its political ties with Denmark; it is included in the List of World Heritage Sites in North America. The United Kingdom and Ireland are included in Western Europe even though they are sometimes listed in Northern Europe.

Sweden is home to the most inscribed sites with 15 sites, two of which are transborder properties. Three sites are shared between several countries: the Curonian Spit (Lithuania and Russia), the High Coast / Kvarken Archipelago (Sweden and Finland) and the Struve Geodetic Arc (ten countries in Northern and Eastern Europe). The first sites from the region were inscribed in 1979, when the Urnes Stave Church and Bryggen, both in Norway were chosen a year after the list's conception. Each year, UNESCO's World Heritage Committee may inscribe new sites on the list, or delist sites that no longer meet the criteria. Selection is based on ten criteria: six for cultural heritage (i–vi) and four for natural heritage (vii–x). Some sites, designated "mixed sites," represent both cultural and natural heritage. In Northern Europe, there are 32 cultural, 4 natural, and 1 mixed sites.

The World Heritage Committee may also specify that a site is endangered, citing "conditions which threaten the very characteristics for which a property was inscribed on the World Heritage List." None of the sites in Northern Europe has ever been listed as endangered, though possible danger listing has been considered by UNESCO in a number of cases.

Legend

Site; named after the World Heritage Committee's official designation
Location; at city, regional, or provincial level and geocoordinates
Criteria; as defined by the World Heritage Committee
Area; in hectares and acres. If available, the size of the buffer zone has been noted as well. A value of zero implies that no data has been published by UNESCO
Year; during which the site was inscribed to the World Heritage List
Description; brief information about the site, including reasons for qualifying as an endangered site, if applicable

World Heritage Sites

Tentative list
Denmark (7)
 Amalienborg and its district (1993)
 Moler landscape of Limfjord (2010)
 The Maritime Heritage of Dragør Old Town and Harbour - A ‘skipper-town’ from the era of the great tall ships in the 18th and 19th centuries (2019)
 Viking Age Ring fortresses (2018)

Estonia (3)
 Kuressaare Fortress (2002)
 Baltic Klint (2004)
 Wooded meadows (Laelatu, Kalli-Nedrema, Mäepea, Allika, Tagamoisa, Loode, Koiva, Halliste) (2004)

Finland (7)
 The Carvings from historic time at the island of Gaddtarmen (Hauensuoli) (1990)
 The large Stone Age ruin of Kastelli at Pattijoki (1990)
 The rock paintings of Astuvansalmi at Ristiina (1990)
 The Holy place of worship of Ukonsaari by the Sami people at Inari (1990)
 Paimio Hospital (formerly Paimio Sanatorium) (2004)
 Saimaa-Pielinen Lake System (2004)

Iceland (7)
 Breiðafjörður Nature Reserve (2011)
 Mývatn and Laxá (2011)
 Viking monuments and sites/Þingvellir National Park (2011)
 Þingvellir National Park (2011)
 The Turf House Tradition (2011)
 Torfajökull Volcanic System/Fjallabak Nature Reserve (2013)

Latvia (3)
 Viking Monuments and Sites/Grobiņa archaeological complex (2011)
 Kuldīga Old Town in the Primeval Valley of the River Venta (2011)
 Meanders of the Upper Daugava (2011)

Lithuania (2)
 Trakai Historical National Park (2003)
 Kaunas 1919-1939: The Capital Inspired by the Moderne Movement (2017)

Norway (5)
 The Laponian area – Tysfjord, the fjord of Hellenbotn and Rago (extension) (2002)
 The Lofoten Islands (2007)
 Svalbard Archipelago (2007)
 Islands of Jan Mayen og Bouvet as part of a serial transnational nomination of the Mid-Atlantic Ridge System (2007)
 Viking Monuments and Sites/Vestfold Ship Burials and Hyllestad Quernstone Quarries (2011)

Sweden (1)
 The Rise of Systematic Biology (2009)

Notes

References
Notes

Europe
Northern Europe